Bruce Hugh Garnsey  (26 September 1920 – 17 April 2006) served as the Chairman of the Asia-Pacific Scout Committee.

Garnsey was made a Member of the Order of the British Empire (MBE) in the 1964 Queen's Birthday Honours for his service as National Commissioner for Training, Australian Boy Scouts' Association.

In 1971, Garnsey was awarded the 62nd Bronze Wolf, the only distinction of the World Organization of the Scout Movement, awarded by the World Scout Committee for exceptional services to world Scouting.

In the 1978 Australia Day Honours he was made an Officer of the Order of Australia (AO) for "For distinguished service to the Scout Association of Australia and to world scouting".

His death was recorded in the Triennial Report 2005–2008: In Support of World Scouting 5.

References

External links

List of Recipients of the Bronze Wolf Award

1920 births
2006 deaths
Members of the Order of the British Empire
Officers of the Order of Australia
Recipients of the Bronze Wolf Award
Scouting and Guiding in Australia